Eyvazlı or Evazlı or Eyvazly may refer to:
 Eyvazlı, Agdam, Azerbaijan
 Eyvazlı, Qubadli, Azerbaijan